Lutimonas is a genus in the phylum Bacteroidota (Bacteria).

References 

Bacteria genera
Flavobacteria